Nagakura (written: 永倉 or 長倉) is a Japanese surname. Notable people with the surname include:

, Japanese footballer
, Japanese photographer
, Japanese swordsman and member of the Shinsengumi

Japanese-language surnames